The men's 67.5 kg weightlifting competitions at the 1968 Summer Olympics in Mexico City took place on 15 October at the Teatro de los Insurgentes. It was the eleventh appearance of the lightweight class.

Results

References

Weightlifting at the 1968 Summer Olympics